Muhammad Akhtar FRS (born 23 February 1933) is a British-Pakistani biochemist, and former Director General of the School of Biological Sciences, at the University of the Punjab.

Biography
He spent the years 1959 to 1963 doing science research in Cambridge, Massachusetts before moving to the University of Southampton, UK as a lecturer, then reader and then Professor of Biochemistry (1973-1978). From 1978 until 1991 he was head of the Department of Biochemistry. He was chairman of the School of Biochemical and Physiological Sciences from 1983 to 1987 and chairman of the Institute of Biomolecular Sciences from 1989 to 1991.  He was a founding fellow of the Third World Academy of Sciences in 1984 and a director of the SERC Centre for Molecular Recognition from 1990-1994.

He was appointed Director General of the School of Biological Sciences at the University of the Punjab, Lahore, Pakistan in 2002. He is also an emeritus professor of the University of Southampton. He is also an honorary fellow at the University College London.

He was elected a Fellow of the Royal Society in 1980.

References

1933 births
Living people
Pakistani biochemists
Academics of the University of Southampton
Fellows of the Royal Society
TWAS fellows
Pakistani emigrants to the United Kingdom